Advanced System Optimizer (formerly Advanced Vista Optimizer) is a software utility for Microsoft Windows developed by Systweak (a company founded in 1999 by Mr. Shrishail Rana), intended to improve computer performance and speed.

Features 

Advanced System Optimizer has utilities for optimization, speedup, cleanup, memory management, etc. Its utilities include system cleaners, system and memory optimizers, junk file cleaners, privacy protectors, startup managers, security tools and other maintenance tools. The software also includes utilities to repair missing or broken DLLs and erase files, and it features a "what's recommended" section that displays PC problems and actions that can improve PC performance.

The "Single Click Care" option scans the computer for optimization all areas of the computer. This program features an "Optimization" tab, which is used for memory optimization and to free up memory of the computer. The startup manager feature of this program is used to manage programs that load at the computer's startup.

The registry cleaner has 12 categories of registry errors and can detect and delete registry errors.

The 2008 version had over 25 tools. It can be scheduled to run optimization without the need for user intervention.

Reception 

In a review syndicated to The Washington Post, PC World praised the quality of the suite's design, stating the tools perform as advertised. The reviewer did however note the product's price as one drawback. PC Advisor also praised the package's functionality, but warned readers they would have to decide for themselves whether it is worth the price considering the availability of free alternatives.

Alternatives 
Alternative system optimization utilities include 
SafeSoft PC Cleaner
and CCleaner.

References

External links 
 
 Descargar Advanced SystemCare 16.2.0.169 gratis
Computer system optimization software
Shareware
Utilities for Windows